Nefedovskaya is a rural locality (a village) in Yavengskoye Rural Settlement, Vozhegodsky District, Vologda Oblast, Russia. The population was 16 as of 2002.

Geography 
The distance to Vozhega is 27.9 km, to Baza is 8 km. Belavinskaya, Khodinskaya, Mikhaylovskaya, Panteleyevskaya, Repnyakovskaya, Lupachikha, Karpovskaya are the nearest rural localities.

References 

Rural localities in Vozhegodsky District